Wernbeorht (or Werenberht) was a medieval Bishop of Leicester.

Wernbeorht was consecrated between 801 and 803. He died between 814 and 816.

Citations

References

External links
 

Bishops of Leicester (ancient)
9th-century English bishops